Mehernagar is situated in East Godavari district in Kakinada Urban, in Andhra Pradesh State, India.

References

Villages in East Godavari district